The second USS Vengeance was a brig in the United States Navy during the First Barbary War.

Vengeance was purchased by the United States Navy at Boston, Massachusetts, in 1805 for use as a bomb ketch against the Barbary pirates. 

Commanded by Lieutenant William Lewis, she left Boston for the Mediterranean on 19 June and was with Capt. John Rodgers' squadron of 13 warships when it appeared off Tunis on 1 August. Impressed by the American show of force, the Bey of Tunis elected to accept American peace terms, and Vengeance did not see action. Her subsequent movements are unknown, but she was broken up at New York City in 1818.

References 

Brigs of the United States Navy
1805 ships